Lobatón is a surname. Notable people with the surname include:
Abel Lobatón (born 1977), Peruvian football striker
Carlos Lobatón (born 1980), Peruvian football midfielder
José Lobatón (born 1984), Venezuelan baseball catcher
Paco Lobatón (born 1951), Spanish journalist 

Spanish-language surnames